The Eurovision Song Contest 1989 was the 34th edition of the annual Eurovision Song Contest. Organised by the European Broadcasting Union (EBU) and host broadcaster Swiss Broadcasting Corporation (SRG SSR), the contest was held at Palais de Beaulieu on 6 May 1989 and was hosted by Swiss model Lolita Morena and journalist Jacques Deschenaux.

Twenty-two countries took part in the contest with  returning after having been disqualified the year before.

This was the only victory for Yugoslavia as a unified state. As of 2022 they are still the last act to win the contest performing last.

Location

Lausanne is a city in the French-speaking part of Switzerland, and the capital and biggest city of the canton of Vaud. The city is situated on the shores of Lake Geneva (or simply Le Léman). It faces the French town of Évian-les-Bains, with the Jura Mountains to its north-west.

Palais de Beaulieu, a convention and exhibition centre, was chosen to host the 1989 contest. The centre includes the 1,844 seat Théâtre de Beaulieu concert, dance and theatre hall. Inaugurated in 1954, the Théâtre de Beaulieu is the biggest theatre in Switzerland. The Eurovision Song Contest took place in the Hall 6 + 7 of the Palais, to the right from the main hall and the theatre.

Contest overview
The United Kingdom's Ray Caruana, lead singer of Live Report was outspoken about coming second to what he considered a much less worthy song. They had been defeated by 7 points.

Two of the performers, Nathalie Pâque and Gili Natanael were respectively 11 and 12 years old at their time of competing. Due to bad publicity surrounding their participation, the European Broadcasting Union introduced a rule stating that no performer would be allowed to take part before the year of their 16th birthday. This rule remains in place to the present day.

The previous year's winner, Céline Dion, opened the show with a mimed performance of her winning song and a mimed performance of her first English-language single, "Where Does My Heart Beat Now". The song became a top ten hit in the US a year later - effectively launching her into international success.

Participating countries

Conductors
Each performance (except Austria, Iceland and Germany) had a conductor who led the orchestra. Unlike in most years and like in 1988, the conductors took their bows after each song, not before.

Finland's longtime conductor Ossi Runne would conduct his last song before passing his baton to his successor Olli Ahvenlahti.

 Mario Natale
 
 Noel Kelehan
 Harry van Hoof
 Timur Selçuk
 
 Ronnie Hazlehurst
 
 Luís Duarte
 Anders Berglund
 Benoît Kaufman
  and Benoît Kaufman
 no conductor
 Ossi Runne
 Guy Mattéoni
 Juan Carlos Calderón
 Haris Andreadis
 Benoît Kaufman
 Giorgos Niarchos
 no conductor
 no conductor

Returning artists

Participants and results

Detailed voting results 

Each country had a jury who awarded 12, 10, 8, 7, 6, 5, 4, 3, 2, 1 point(s) for their top ten songs. There was also a change of rule in case of a tie; prior to 1989, both countries would perform their songs again until a final decision was made. However from 1989 onwards, if there was a tie at the end of the voting, the country that scored the most twelves would be declared the winner. If there was still a tie, the winner was the country that scored the most tens. And if there still was a tie after that, both countries would be declared joint winners.

12 points 
Below is a summary of all 12 points in the final:

Spokespersons 

Each country announced their votes in the order of performance. The following is a list of spokespersons who announced the votes for their respective country.

 
 Yitzhak Shim'oni
 Eileen Dunne
 Joop van Os
 Canan Kumbasar
 An Ploegaerts
 Colin Berry
 
 Margarida Mercês de Melo
 Agneta Bolme Börjefors
 
 
 
 Solveig Herlin
 Marie-Ange Nardi
 Matilde Jarrín
 Anna Partelidou
 Michel Stocker
 Fotini Giannoulatou
 Erla Björk Skúladóttir
 Gabi Schnelle
 Dijana Čulić

Broadcasts 

Each participating broadcaster was required to relay the contest via its networks. Non-participating member broadcasters were also able to relay the contest as "passive participants". Broadcasters were able to send commentators to provide coverage of the contest in their own native language and to relay information about the artists and songs to their television viewers. Known details on the broadcasts in each country, including the specific broadcasting stations and commentators are shown in the tables below.

See also
Eurovision Young Dancers 1989

Notes

References

External links

 
1989
Music festivals in Switzerland
1989 in music
1989 in Switzerland
Events in Lausanne
May 1989 events in Europe
20th century in Lausanne